Ernestina may refer to:

People 

Ernestina Cravello (1880-1942), Italian-American anarcha-feminist
Clodoaldo de Oliveira, a Brazilian footballer
Ernestina Edem Appiah, a Ghanaian social entrepreneur

Places 

Ernestina, Rio Grande do Sul, a municipality in Brazil
Santa Ernestina, a municipality in Brazil
Ernestina, Queensland, a former rural locality in Queensland, Australia, now amalgamated into the locality of Longreach

Other 

 Effie M. Morrissey, a schooner now known as Ernestina